Aldo Salandra (born 3 June 1958) is a Salvadoran sprinter. He competed in the men's 100 metres at the 1984 Summer Olympics.

References

1958 births
Living people
Athletes (track and field) at the 1984 Summer Olympics
Salvadoran male sprinters
Olympic athletes of El Salvador
Place of birth missing (living people)
Central American Games silver medalists for El Salvador
Central American Games medalists in athletics